Rollingstone is a city in Winona County, Minnesota, United States. The population was 664 at the 2010 census.

History
Rollingstone was founded by immigrants from Luxembourg.  The city was named after nearby Rollingstone Creek.  Two properties in Rollingstone are listed on the National Register of Historic Places: the 1869 Church of the Holy Trinity and the 1900 Rollingstone Village Hall.

Geography

Demographics

2010 census
As of the census of 2010, there were 664 people, 254 households, and 192 families living in the city. The racial makeup of the city was 98.6% White, 0.3% Native American, 0.9% Asian, and 0.2% from two or more races. Hispanic or Latino of any race were 0.8% of the population.

There were 254 households, of which 35.0% had children under the age of 18 living with them, 63.4% were married couples living together, 7.1% had a female householder with no husband present, 5.1% had a male householder with no wife present, and 24.4% were non-families. 17.7% of all households were made up of individuals, and 9.9% had someone living alone who was 65 years of age or older. The average household size was 2.61 and the average family size was 2.99.

The median age in the city was 41.2 years. 25.3% of residents were under the age of 18; 7.9% were between the ages of 18 and 24; 21.9% were from 25 to 44; 31.6% were from 45 to 64; and 13.1% were 65 years of age or older. The gender makeup of the city was 52.9% male and 47.1% female.

2000 census
As of the census of 2000, there were 697 people, 245 households, and 203 families living in the city. The racial makeup of the city was 99.43% White, 0.14% African American, 0.14% Native American, 0.14% Asian, 0.14% from other races. Hispanic or Latino of any race were 0.57% of the population.

There were 245 households, out of which 49.4% had children under the age of 18 living with them, 68.6% were married couples living together, 12.2% had a female householder with no husband present, and 17.1% were non-families. 13.5% of all households were made up of individuals, and 7.8% had someone living alone who was 65 years of age or older. The average household size was 2.84 and the average family size was 3.14.

In the city, the population was spread out, with 31.9% under the age of 18, 6.9% from 18 to 24, 30.8% from 25 to 44, 19.8% from 45 to 64, and 10.6% who were 65 years of age or older. The median age was 34 years. For every 100 females, there were 98.6 males. For every 100 females age 18 and over, there were 90.8 males.

The median income for a household in the city was $45,000, and the median income for a family was $49,083. Males had a median income of $34,250 versus $23,750 for females. The per capita income for the city was $17,294. About 1.6% of families and 2.5% of the population were below the poverty line, including 3.6% of those under age 18 and 3.2% of those age 65 or over.

References

External links
 Rollingstone Minnesota Community Guide

Cities in Minnesota
Cities in Winona County, Minnesota
Luxembourgian-American culture in Minnesota